is a Japanese judoka. She won the bronze medal in the middleweight (70 kg) division at the 2010 World Judo Championships.

External links
 

1985 births
Living people
People from Niigata (city)
Japanese female judoka
Japan Ground Self-Defense Force personnel
Universiade medalists in judo
Universiade gold medalists for Japan
Medalists at the 2007 Summer Universiade
Medalists at the 2009 Summer Universiade
20th-century Japanese women
21st-century Japanese women